The 2016 South American Aerobic Gymnastics Championships were held in Bogotá, Colombia, August 24–29, 2016. The competition was organized by the Colombian Gymnastics Federation, and approved by the International Gymnastics Federation.

Participating countries

Medalists

References

2016 in gymnastics
International gymnastics competitions hosted by Colombia
2016 in Colombian sport
South American Gymnastics Championships